The 2018–19 UEFA Women's Champions League knockout phase began on 12 September 2018 and ended on 18 May 2019 with the final at Groupama Arena in Budapest, Hungary, to decide the champions of the 2018–19 UEFA Women's Champions League. A total of 32 teams competed in the knockout phase.

Times are CET/CEST, as listed by UEFA (local times, if different, are in parentheses).

Qualified teams
The knockout phase involved 32 teams: 20 teams which received a bye, and the 12 teams which advanced from the qualifying round (ten group winners and two best runners-ups).

Below are the 32 teams which participated in the knockout phase (with their 2018 UEFA club coefficients, which take into account their performance in European competitions from 2013–14 to 2017–18 plus 33% of their association coefficient from the same time span).

Bracket

Format

Each tie in the knockout phase, apart from the final, was played over two legs, with each team playing one leg at home. The team that scores more goals on aggregate over the two legs advanced to the next round. If the aggregate score was level, the away goals rule was applied, i.e. the team that scoredmore goals away from home over the two legs advanced. If away goals were also equal, then extra time was played. The away goals rule was again applied after extra time, i.e. if there were goals scored during extra time and the aggregate score was still level, the visiting team advanced by virtue of more away goals scored. If no goals were scored during extra time, the tie was decided by penalty shoot-out. In the final, which was played as a single match, if the score was level at the end of normal time, extra time was played, followed by penalty shoot-out if the score remained tied.

The mechanism of the draws for each round is as follows:
In the draw for the round of 32, the sixteen teams with the highest UEFA club coefficients were seeded (with the title holders being the automatic top seed), and the other sixteen teams were unseeded. The seeded teams were drawn against the unseeded teams, with the seeded teams hosting the second leg. Teams from the same association or the same qualifying round group could not be drawn against each other.
In the draw for the round of 16, the eight teams with the highest UEFA club coefficients were seeded (with the title holders being the automatic top seed should they qualify), and the other eight teams were unseeded. The seeded teams were drawn against the unseeded teams, with the order of legs decided by draw. Teams from the same association could not be drawn against each other.
In the draws for the quarter-finals and semi-finals, there was no seeding, and teams from the same association could be drawn against each other. As the draws for the quarter-finals and semi-finals were held together before the quarter-finals were played, the identity of the quarter-final winners was not known at the time of the semi-final draw. A draw was also held to determine which semi-final winner was designated as the "home" team for the final (for administrative purposes as it is played at a neutral venue).

On 17 July 2014, the UEFA emergency panel ruled that Ukrainian and Russian clubs would not be drawn against each other "until further notice" due to the political unrest between the countries.

Schedule
The schedule of the knockout phase is as follows (all draws are held at the UEFA headquarters in Nyon, Switzerland).

Round of 32

The draw for the round of 32 was held on 17 August 2018, 14:00 CEST, at the UEFA headquarters in Nyon, Switzerland.

Notes

Overview

The first legs were played on 12 and 13 September, and the second legs on 26 and 27 September 2018.

|}

Matches

Zürich won 6–1 on aggregate.

Fiorentina won 4–0 on aggregate.

Ajax won 4–1 on aggregate.

Lyon won 7–0 on aggregate.

Rosengård won 3–0 on aggregate.

Brøndby won 3–2 on aggregate.

Chelsea won 11–0 on aggregate.

Atlético Madrid won 3–1 on aggregate.

VfL Wolfsburg won 3–0 on aggregate.

Slavia Praha won 7–0 on aggregate.

Barcelona won 4–3 on aggregate.

Glasgow City won 2–1 on aggregate.

Bayern Munich won 11–0 on aggregate.

Paris Saint-Germain won 6–1 on aggregate.

Linköping won 10–1 on aggregate.

LSK Kvinner won 4–0 on aggregate.

Round of 16

The draw for the round of 16 was held on 1 October 2018, 13:00 CEST, at the UEFA headquarters in Nyon, Switzerland.

Overview

The first legs were played on 17 and 18 October, and the second legs on 31 October and 1 November 2018.

|}

Matches

Bayern Munich won 5–0 on aggregate.

VfL Wolfsburg won 10–0 on aggregate.

Lyon won 13–0 on aggregate.

Barcelona won 8–0 on aggregate.

Paris Saint-Germain won 5–2 on aggregate.

Chelsea won 7–0 on aggregate.

Slavia Praha won 3–2 on aggregate.

LSK Kvinner won 3–1 on aggregate.

Quarter-finals

The draw for the quarter-finals was held on 9 November 2018, 13:00 CET, at the UEFA headquarters in Nyon, Switzerland.

Overview

The first legs were played on 20 and 21 March, and the second legs on 27 March 2019.

During the Chelsea - PSG tie a number of arrests were made by the Metropolitan Police of travelling supporters of PSG who were arrested for possession of illegal drugs, weapons and vandalism. This was after disorder was reported at Waterloo and Wimbledon Train stations and a bus carrying PSG supporters being searched and barred entry to Kingsmeadow Stadium.

|}

Matches

Bayern Munich won 6–2 on aggregate.

Barcelona won 4–0 on aggregate.

Lyon won 6–3 on aggregate.

Chelsea won 3–2 on aggregate.

Semi-finals

The draw for the semi-finals was held on 9 November 2018, 13:00 CET (after the quarter-final draw), at the UEFA headquarters in Nyon, Switzerland.

Overview

The first legs were played on 21 April, and the second legs on 28 April 2019.

|}

Matches

Lyon won 3–2 on aggregate.

Barcelona won 2–0 on aggregate.

Final

The final was played on 18 May 2019 at the Groupama Arena in Budapest. The "home" team for the final (for administrative purposes) was determined by an additional draw held after the quarter-final and semi-final draws.

Notes

References

External links

2
September 2018 sports events in Europe
October 2018 sports events in Europe
November 2018 sports events in Europe
March 2019 sports events in Europe
April 2019 sports events in Europe
May 2019 sports events in Europe